Palin (from ,  or 'sofa') refers to any one of six types of thrones recognized in traditional Burmese scholarship. The palin is an important symbol of the Burmese monarchy and features prominently in Burmese architecture and Burmese Buddhist iconography. The palin is featured on the seal of Myanmar's Ministry of Religious Affairs and Culture.

Types of palin 

Traditional Burmese scholarship recognizes six types of thrones, namely:

  – the Buddha's throne
  – Brahma's throne
  – nat's throne
  – monarch's throne
  – Buddhist monk's throne
  – judge's throne

Usage by Burmese monarchs 

Traditionally, Burmese palaces possessed eight types of thrones, housed in nine palace halls, leading to the Burmese adage, "eight thrones, nine palace halls" (ပလ္လင်ရှစ်ခန်း ရွှေနန်းကိုးဆောင်).

The thrones were carved of wood, specifically by hereditary palace carpenters. An auspicious time was chosen by astrologers to commence operations, and construction of these thrones was heralded by a royal ceremony to propitiate spirits. The thrones were simultaneously constructed according to a prescribed list of requirements, coated with resin, and decorated with gold leaf and glass mosaic.

The most important throne was the "Lion Throne", which had a replica in the Hluttaw as well.

The thrones used different prescribed motifs and designs, types of wood, and were allocated to specific halls in the royal palace. The thrones were also grouped by height, as follows:

 (မဟာပလ္လင်) – 
 (မဇ္စျိမပလ္လင်) – 
 (စူဠပလ္လင်) – 

Below is a list of these eight types of thrones:

Usage in Buddhism 

The palin is also used to seat images and statues of the Buddha, variously called gaw palin (ဂေါ့ပလ္လင်), phaya palin (ဘုရားပလ္လင်) or samakhan (စမ္မခဏ်), from the Pali term . This palin is a feature of many Buddhist household shrines in Burma.

References

See also 

 Busabok, the Thai equivalent
 Throne

Burmese culture
Burmese monarchy
Burmese Buddhist architecture
Buddhist iconography
Thrones